Mihai Alexandru Bălașa (born 14 January 1995) is a Romanian professional footballer who plays for Liga I side Sepsi OSK as a defender.

Club career

Viitorul Constanța
Bălașa made his professional debut for Viitorul Constanța on 20 August 2012, in a Liga I game against Gaz Metan Mediaș.

Roma
In August 2014, Bălașa was transferred by Italian club Roma, joining a growing Romanian contingent at the club. He was part of the squad for the 2014 International Champions Cup, featuring as a second-half substitute against Internazionale.

On 22 August 2014, Bălașa signed for Crotone on loan. He made his debut in the 0–2 defeat to Ternana on 30 August 2014.

Bălașa joined Trapani on a season-long loan on 16 July 2016.

FCSB
Bălașa returned to Romania in January 2017, signing a five-year contract with FCSB for an undisclosed transfer fee.

On 2 August 2017, he scored the opener from a free kick in a Champions League third qualifying round 4–1 away win over Viktoria Plzeň.

International career
Bălașa has represented Romania on many occasions at youth level.

He earned his first cap for the senior side in a 2018 FIFA World Cup qualification match against Denmark on 8 October 2017, playing the full 90 minutes in the 1–1 away draw.

Personal life
Bălașa's father Cristian was also a professional footballer. He played as a midfielder and scored 26 goals in 224 Divizia A matches for Chindia Târgoviște, Argeș Pitești and Farul Constanța combined.

Career statistics

Club

International

Honours
Universitatea Craiova
Cupa României: 2020–21
Supercupa României: 2021

Sepsi OSK 
Cupa României: 2021–22
Supercupa României: 2022

References

External links

1995 births
Living people
Sportspeople from Târgoviște
Association football defenders
Romanian footballers
Liga I players
FC Viitorul Constanța players
Serie B players
A.S. Roma players
F.C. Crotone players
Trapani Calcio players
FC Steaua București players
CS Universitatea Craiova players
Sepsi OSK Sfântu Gheorghe players
Romania youth international footballers
Romania under-21 international footballers
Romania international footballers
Romanian expatriate footballers
Expatriate footballers in Italy
Romanian expatriate sportspeople in Italy